The Western Conference of the Women's National Basketball Association (WNBA) is made up of six teams.

From the league's second season in 1998 through 2015, the WNBA operated separate playoff brackets for its Eastern and Western Conferences. Each conference's playoff was divided into two playoff rounds, the Conference Semi-Finals and the Conference Finals, with the Conference Finals winners receiving Conference Championships and advancing to the WNBA Finals to determine the WNBA champion. In the final years of this playoff scheme, all in-conference playoff series were best-of-three.

Since 2016, the league has abandoned separate conference playoffs in favor of a single league-wide playoff bracket. The top eight teams in the regular season, without regard to conference affiliation, advance to the playoffs, which are seeded based strictly on regular-season record (with tiebreakers as needed). The bottom four playoff teams play single-elimination games (5 vs. 8, 6 vs. 7) in the first round, with the higher seeds (5 and 6) hosting the games. The first-round winners advance to the second round, where they play the 3 and 4 seeds in single-elimination games. The 3 seed hosts the lower seed among the first-round winners, with the 4 seed hosting the other first-round survivor. The winners of these games advance to the WNBA Semifinals, where they face the top two seeds in best-of-five series. In this round, the 1 seed plays the lower seed among the second-round winners, and the 2 seed plays the other second-round winner. Both series are best-of-five and played in a 2–2–1 formet, with the higher seeds (1 and 2) hosting the first two games plus a possible fifth game. The winners of these series advance to the best-of-five WNBA Finals.

Teams

Former teams
Defunct
 Houston Comets (1997–2008)
 Portland Fire (2000–2002)
 Sacramento Monarchs (1997–2009)
Relocated
 Utah Starzz to San Antonio Silver Stars (2003)
 Detroit Shock (East) to Tulsa Shock (2010)
 Tulsa Shock to Dallas Wings (2016)
 San Antonio Stars to Las Vegas Aces (2017)

Western Conference champions
The WNBA awarded conference championships between 1998 and 2015 to the winners of the Conference Finals in the playoffs. Conference championships were not awarded in the 1997 inaugural season, and they were again discontinued since the WNBA adopted its current single-table playoff format in 2016. 

WNBA champions in bold

 1998: Houston Comets
 1999: Houston Comets (2)
 2000: Houston Comets (3)
 2001: Los Angeles Sparks
 2002: Los Angeles Sparks (2)
 2003: Los Angeles Sparks (3)
 2004: Seattle Storm
 2005: Sacramento Monarchs
 2006: Sacramento Monarchs (2)
 2007: Phoenix Mercury
 2008: San Antonio Silver Stars
 2009: Phoenix Mercury (2)
 2010: Seattle Storm (2)
 2011: Minnesota Lynx
 2012: Minnesota Lynx (2)
 2013: Minnesota Lynx (3)
 2014: Phoenix Mercury (3)
 2015: Minnesota Lynx (4)

All-time regular-season conference standings

2019 season

2018 season

2017 season

2016 season

2015 season

2014 season

2013 season

2012 season

2011 season

2010 season

2009 season

2008 season

2007 season

2006 season

2005 season

2004 season

2003 season

2002 season

2001 season

2000 season

1999 season

1998 season

1997 season

Women's National Basketball Association
Sports in the Western United States